Dame Rosalie Winterton,  (born 10 August 1958) is a British Labour Party politician who has been the Member of Parliament (MP) for Doncaster Central since 1997. In June 2017, Winterton became one of three Deputy Speakers in the House of Commons.

She served under Prime Minister Tony Blair as a minister in the Department for Health, then under Gordon Brown as the Minister of State for Transport from 2007 to 2008, Minister for Work and Pensions from 2008 to 2009, and the Minister for Local Government from 2009 to 2010, making her the only one of the current Speaker and Deputy Speakers to have served as a minister in government. She later entered the Shadow Cabinet in May 2010 as the Shadow Leader of the House of Commons.

In September 2010, Winterton was nominated and elected unopposed as Labour Chief Whip and served in the post until October 2016. She was elected as one of three deputy speakers of the House of Commons on 28 June 2017 and re-elected unopposed on 7 January 2020,
On 27 February 2022, Winterton announced she would not contest the next UK general election.

Early life
Winterton was educated at St Mary's (now Hill House School, Doncaster), Ackworth School (an independent school) and Doncaster Grammar School on Thorne Road (now Hall Cross Academy). She then read for a BA in history at the University of Hull, which she graduated with in 1979. She first worked as John Prescott's Constituency Personal Assistant from 1980 until 1986, and then Parliamentary Officers, first for Southwark Council for two years until 1988 and then for a further two for the Royal College of Nursing until 1990.

After working for four years in the private sector, as Managing Director of Connect Public Affairs, she returned to politics to assist John Prescott in 1994; Prescott had been elected as the Deputy Leader of the Labour Party, and Winterton worked as Head of Office for the Deputy Party Leader until 1997.

Parliamentary career
Winterton became an MP in the 1997 election, serving the safe Labour seat of Doncaster Central constituency with a vote share exceeding 50% in each general election until 2010, where her vote share fell to 39.7%.

She entered government in 2001, serving as a Parliamentary Under-Secretary of State in the Lord Chancellor's Department, and became a Minister of State at the Department for Health in June 2003; in January 2006 her responsibilities were changed to Health Services, including responsibility for NHS dentistry. She presided over the introduction of the new NHS dental contract of April 2006.

In June 2007, she was appointed Minister of State at the Department for Transport by the new Prime Minister, Gordon Brown. Winterton was subsequently appointed Minister for Yorkshire and the Humber in addition to her DfT responsibilities on 24 January 2008. She was promoted to Minister of State for Pensions at the Department for Work and Pensions in the October 2008 reshuffle, retaining her Ministerial brief for Yorkshire and the Humber.

In the June 2009 reshuffle, Winterton was moved to Minister of State for Regional Economic Development and Co-ordination at the Department for Business, Innovation and Skills and the Department for Communities and Local Government and, in that role, was invited to attend cabinet when her responsibility was on the agenda.

In September 2010, she was nominated and elected unopposed as Labour Chief Whip and served until October 2016, when she was replaced by Nick Brown.

In June 2017, Winterton was elected to serve as Second Deputy Chairman of Ways and Means.

She is a member of Labour Friends of Israel.

On 27 February 2022, Winterton announced her intention to stand down at the next general election.

Expenses scandal

Winterton was one of a number of Government Ministers who secretly repaid back some of expenses money which they had wrongly claimed. In the row over MPs' expenses, it was claimed she used taxpayers' cash to soundproof the bedroom of her south London flat. According to The Daily Telegraph, the minister claimed a total of £86,277 over four years in additional costs allowance – close to the total allowed under Parliament's green book.

Honours
In June 2006, she was appointed a member of Her Majesty's Most Honourable Privy Council, and she was sworn in on 19 July 2006.

She was appointed Dame Commander of the Order of the British Empire (DBE) in the 2016 New Year Honours.

Notes

References

External links
 Rosie Winterton MP official constituency website

|-

|-

|-

|-

|-

|-

|-

1958 births
Living people
People educated at Hill House School, South Yorkshire
People educated at Ackworth School
Alumni of the University of Hull
Dames Commander of the Order of the British Empire
Female members of the Parliament of the United Kingdom for English constituencies
Labour Party (UK) MPs for English constituencies
Members of the Privy Council of the United Kingdom
Labour Friends of Israel
Politics of Doncaster
UK MPs 1997–2001
UK MPs 2001–2005
UK MPs 2005–2010
UK MPs 2010–2015
UK MPs 2015–2017
UK MPs 2017–2019
UK MPs 2019–present
20th-century British women politicians
21st-century British women politicians
Deputy Speakers of the British House of Commons
20th-century English women
20th-century English people
21st-century English women
21st-century English people
Women legislative deputy speakers